December 6 - Eastern Orthodox liturgical calendar - December 8

All fixed commemorations below celebrated on December 20 by Eastern Orthodox Churches on the Old Calendar.

For December 7th, Orthodox Churches on the Old Calendar commemorate the Saints listed on November 24.

Saints
 Holy Apostle Tychicus (1st century)  (see also: December 8)
 Martyr Athenodorus of Mesopotamia (304)
 Martyr Neophytus, by drowning. 
 Martyr Dometius, by the sword. 
 Martyrs Priscus, Martin, and Nicholas, near Blachernae.
 Martyrs Isidore, Acepsimas, and Leo, by fire. 
 Martyrs Gaianos and Gaina, by fire.
 Venerable Ammon, Bishop of Nitria (c. 350) (see also October 4 )
 Saint Ambrose of Milan, Bishop  (Ambrose of Mediolanum) (397)  
 Holy Orthodox Woman Martyr, in Rome, by being burned alive, for refusing Arianism.
 Holy Orthodox Martyrs burned in the Temple, in Carthage, by the Arians.
 Holy 362 martyrs of Africa, martyred by the Arians:
 Holy 300 martyrs of Africa martyred by the Arians, by beheading, under Huneric (c. 477-484)
 Holy 60 Hieromartyrs, Priests, by having their tongues cut out (c. 474-476)
 Holy 2 Hieromartyrs, Priests, under Huneric, by sawing (c. 474-476)
 Saint Bassa of Jerusalem, Abbess (5th century) (see also: December 9 - Greek)
 Saint Ignatius, monk, near Blachernae.
 Saint Paul the Obedient, of Cyprus.
 Venerable John the Faster, of St. Sabbas Monastery.

Pre-Schism Western saints
 Saint Urban of Teano (Urbanus), Bishop of Teano in Campania, Confessor (c. 356)
 Saint Victor of Piacenza, first Bishop of Piacenza c. 322-375, defender of Orthodoxy against Arianism (375)
 Saint Anianus (Agnan, Aignan), fifth Bishop of Chartres in France (5th century)
 Saint Martin of Saujon, a disciple of St Martin of Tours, founded the monastery of Saujon (c. 400)
 Saint Servus, a layman of noble birth, martyred under the Arian Vandal King Huneric (483)  (see also: December 6)
 Saint Buithe (Buite, Boethius), founder of Monasterboice in Ireland (521)
 Saint Burgundofara (Fara), founder of Faremoutiers Abbey (657)
 Saint Diuma, Bishop of the Mercians and Middle Anglians (7th century)

Post-Schism Orthodox saints
 Saint Philothea of Turnovo (Philothea of Thrace, the Protectress of Romania) (1060)
 Saint John, faster of the Kiev Caves (12th century)
 Righteous Gerasimos, Ascetic of Euboea, missionary of Greece in the period of the Frankokratia (c. 1320)
 Venerable Gregory the Silent of Mount Athos, founder of Grigoriou, Mt. Athos (Gregory of Serbia) (1405)
 Saint Nilus of Stolbnyi Island (Nilus, monk of Stolbensk Lake) (1544)
 Saint Anthony, Abbot of Siya Monastery (Novgorod) (1556)
 Righteous Gerasimos Mikragiannanitis, Hymnographer of the Great Church of Christ (1991, N.S.)

New martyrs and confessors
 Hieromartyr Sergius Galkovsky (1917)
 Hieromartyr Antonius Popov, Priest (1918)
 Hieromartyr Andronic (1918)
 Hiero-confessor Ambrose (Polyansky), Bishop of Kamenets-Podolsk (1932)
 Hieromartyrs Sergius Goloshapov, Michael Uspensky and Sergius Uspensky, Priests (1937)
 Hieromartyr Nikiphor Litvin, Deacon, and Hieromartyr Galaction Urbanowicz-Novikov (1937)
 Martyr Joanna Demidova (1937)
 Hieromartyrs Peter Krestov and Basil Mirozhin, Priests (1941)

Other commemorations
 Consecration of the Church of the Theotokos in the district of the Curator, Constantinople ( τοῦ Κουράτορος) (5th century)
 "Seligersk" (Vladimirsk) Icon of the Mother of God.
 Repose of Abbot Gabriel of Valaam (1910)
 Repose of Elder Ephraim of Philotheou and Arizona (2019)

Icon gallery

Notes

References

Sources 
 December 7/20. Orthodox Calendar (PRAVOSLAVIE.RU).
 December 20 / December 7. HOLY TRINITY RUSSIAN ORTHODOX CHURCH (A parish of the Patriarchate of Moscow).
 December 7. OCA - The Lives of the Saints.
 December 7. Latin Saints of the Orthodox Patriarchate of Rome.
 The Roman Martyrology. Transl. by the Archbishop of Baltimore. Last Edition, According to the Copy Printed at Rome in 1914. Revised Edition, with the Imprimatur of His Eminence Cardinal Gibbons. Baltimore: John Murphy Company, 1916. pp. 376–377.
 Rev. Richard Stanton. A Menology of England and Wales, or, Brief Memorials of the Ancient British and English Saints Arranged According to the Calendar, Together with the Martyrs of the 16th and 17th Centuries. London: Burns & Oates, 1892. p. 587-588.
Greek Sources
 Great Synaxaristes:  7 ΔΕΚΕΜΒΡΙΟΥ. ΜΕΓΑΣ ΣΥΝΑΞΑΡΙΣΤΗΣ.
  Συναξαριστής. 7 Δεκεμβρίου. ECCLESIA.GR. (H ΕΚΚΛΗΣΙΑ ΤΗΣ ΕΛΛΑΔΟΣ). 
Russian Sources
  20 декабря (7 декабря). Православная Энциклопедия под редакцией Патриарха Московского и всея Руси Кирилла (электронная версия). (Orthodox Encyclopedia - Pravenc.ru).
  7 декабря (ст.ст.) 20 декабря 2013 (нов. ст.). Русская Православная Церковь Отдел внешних церковных связей. (DECR).

December in the Eastern Orthodox calendar